Joseph Gerard Hendron (born 12 November 1932) is a Northern Ireland politician, a member of the centre-left Irish nationalist Social Democratic and Labour Party (SDLP).

Hendron, also a local GP physician for 40 years, was first elected as a political representative of Belfast West in 1975 to the Northern Ireland Constitutional Convention. He was later elected to Belfast City Council in 1981 and in 1982 to the Northern Ireland Assembly.

Hendron was the Member of Parliament (MP) for Belfast West between April 1992 and May 1997 in the UK Parliament in London. He had taken the seat from Sinn Féin President Gerry Adams at his third attempt with a majority of 1%. He became the only nationalist MP to defeat Adams. The seat had previously been held for the SDLP by Gerry Fitt (later Lord Fitt) until 1983. Hendron attracted unprecedented cross-community support from Nationalists and Unionists in the constituency. This was the only example where an SDLP candidate received a high number of Unionist votes in Belfast West that un-seated a Sinn Féin candidate. Adams regained the seat at the next election in May 1997.

In 1996, Hendron was elected to the Northern Ireland Forum and in 1998 to the newly reconvened Northern Ireland Assembly. However, he lost his seat in the 2003 Northern Ireland Assembly election to a member of Ian Paisley's Democratic Unionist Party.

He was appointed a member of the Northern Ireland Parades Commission in 2005. He retired from this role in December 2010.

References

External links

Bibliography
Maiden Speech : House of Commons – 18 June 1992

1932 births
Living people
Social Democratic and Labour Party MLAs
Members of the Northern Ireland Constitutional Convention
Northern Ireland MPAs 1982–1986
Members of the Northern Ireland Forum
Northern Ireland MLAs 1998–2003
UK MPs 1992–1997
Members of the Parliament of the United Kingdom for Belfast constituencies (since 1922)
Members of Belfast City Council
Social Democratic and Labour Party MPs (UK)